Muqaddar Ka Badshah is a 1990 Hindi-language film directed by T. Rama Rao. It is  a spiritual sequel of 1979 film Muqaddar Ka Sikander. The film stars Vinod Khanna, Shabana Azmi, Vijayshanti, Anupam Kher, Kader Khan and Amrish Puri. Dialogues of this movie became very popular and therefore audio cassette of Dialogues were released it was written by Iqbal Durrani.

Cast
Vinod Khanna ...  Naresh
Shabana Azmi ...  Advocate Sharda Singh
Vijayshanti ...  Bharti Rathod
Anupam Kher ...  Vijay Singh
Kader Khan ...  Inspector Gulshan
Amrish Puri ...  Vikral Singh
Navin Nischol ...  DSP Rathod
Suparna Anand ... Geetha
Aasif Sheikh ... Ashok Singh

Music

External links 
 

1990s Hindi-language films
1990 films
Films directed by T. Rama Rao
Films scored by Viju Shah